Jean-Louis Michel may refer to:
 Jean-Louis Michel (fencer)
 Jean-Louis Michel (oceanographer)